Oh Seung-soon (born 11 July 1963) is a South Korean fencer. She competed in the women's individual foil event at the 1984 Summer Olympics.

References

1963 births
Living people
South Korean female foil fencers
Olympic fencers of South Korea
Fencers at the 1984 Summer Olympics
Asian Games medalists in fencing
Fencers at the 1986 Asian Games
Asian Games silver medalists for South Korea
Medalists at the 1986 Asian Games